Love Is...The Tender Trap is a 1999 studio album by Stacey Kent.

Kent's second studio album, it was produced by and features her husband, tenor saxophonist Jim Tomlinson. In an interview with Billboard magazine to promote the album Kent said that "Even when I'm singing of unrequited love, it may not reflect my life, but the quality of the song allows me to deliver it truthfully".

Reception

Scott Yanow, writing for AllMusic, thought that Kent "has an attractive voice and a lightly swinging style." He added that she "uplifts each of the familiar tunes slightly but does not add much of herself to the material," and concluded by remarking on her future potential.

Track listing 
 "The Tender Trap" (Sammy Cahn, Jimmy Van Heusen) - 4:42		
 "I Didn't Know About You" (Duke Ellington, Bob Russell) - 4:43
 "Comes Love" (Lew Brown, Sam H. Stept, Charles Tobias) - 4:04
 "In the Still of the Night" (Cole Porter) - 5:08
 "Fools Rush In (Where Angels Fear to Tread)" (Rube Bloom, Johnny Mercer) - 4:43
 "East of the Sun" (Brooks Bowman) - 6:36
 "Zing! Went the Strings of My Heart" (James F. Hanley) - 4:14
 "They Say It's Wonderful" (Irving Berlin) - 4:57
 "Don't Be That Way" (Benny Goodman, Mitchell Parish, Edgar Sampson) - 4:22
 "They All Laughed" (George Gershwin, Ira Gershwin) - 4:01
 "In the Wee Small Hours of the Morning" (Bob Hilliard, David Mann) - 4:59	
 "It's a Wonderful World" (Harold Adamson, Jan Savitt, Johnny Watson) - 4:21

Personnel 
Performance
 Stacey Kent – vocals, arranger
 Jim Tomlinson - tenor saxophone, arranger, producer
 David Newton - piano
 Colin Oxley - guitar, arranger
 David Green - double bass
 Jeff Hamilton - drums, arranger
Production
 Curtis Schwartz - engineer, mixing
 Alan Bates - executive producer
 Jay Livingston - liner notes
 Jennifer Abbott - photography

References 

1999 albums
Stacey Kent albums
Chiaroscuro Records albums
Candid Records albums